Combat Aviation Brigade, 1st Armored Division is a Combat Aviation Brigade attached to 1st Armored Division.

Structure

Current formation:
 3d Squadron (Heavy Attack Reconnaissance), 6th Cavalry Regiment (AH-64Ds & RQ-7 Shadow) "Heavy Cav"
 1st Battalion (Attack Reconnaissance), 501st Aviation Regiment (AH-64D) "Iron Dragons"
 2d Battalion (General Support), 501st Aviation Regiment (UH/HH-60, CH-47F) "Iron Knights"
 3d Battalion (Assault Helicopter), 501st Aviation Regiment (UH-60M) "Apocalypse"
 127th Aviation Support Battalion (127th ASB) "Workhorse"
 Company E, 501st Aviation Regiment (Gray Eagle) "Executioners"

References

External links
 

Aviation Brigades of the United States Army